Yenikənd is a village and municipality in the Neftchala Rayon of Azerbaijan.  It has a population of 997.  The municipality consists of the villages of Yenikənd and Qırmızı Şəfəq.

Notes

References 

Populated places in Neftchala District